Hsieh Yu-chieh (born 23 July 1993), formerly known as Hsieh Shu-ying, is a Taiwanese professional tennis player. She is the younger sister of tennis players Hsieh Su-wei and Hsieh Cheng-peng. 

On 20 February 2012, she achieved her career-high singles ranking of world No. 830. On 21 October 2019, she peaked at No. 129 in the doubles rankings. Hsieh has won one WTA 125 doubles title and ten doubles titles on the ITF Women's Circuit.

Tennis career
Yu-chieh started to play tennis at the age of six. Her favourite surface is hardcourt.

On 13 April 2012, she won her first doubles title at an $50k tournament in Wenshan City, China. She and sister Hsieh Su-wei defeated the home team of Liu Wanting and Xu Yifan in the final.

On 26 May 2012, Yu-chieh won her second ITF doubles title, at a $25k event at Karuizawa, Japan. She played with Kumiko Iijima of Japan, beating Samantha Murray and Emily Webley-Smith in three sets.

On 24 March 2014, she won her third ITF doubles title, at a $50k event in Osprey, Florida. She played with Rika Fujiwara of Japan, beating Irina Falconi and Eva Hrdinová in three sets.

She made her first WTA Tour quarterfinal at the International-level tournament in Guangzhou, China, partnering with her sister Su-wei. Her first WTA final followed in September 2018; in Seoul, she and her sister were beaten by Korean pair Choi Ji-hee and Han Na-lae.

WTA career finals

Doubles: 2 (2 runner-ups)

WTA 125 tournament finals

Doubles: 2 (1 title, 1 runner-up)

ITF Circuit finals

Doubles: 19 (10 titles, 9 runner-ups)

Notes

References

External links
 
 

1993 births
Living people
Sportspeople from Kaohsiung
Taiwanese female tennis players
Universiade medalists in tennis
Taiwanese people of Hakka descent
Hakka sportspeople
Universiade gold medalists for Chinese Taipei
Universiade silver medalists for Chinese Taipei
Olympic tennis players of Taiwan
Tennis players at the 2020 Summer Olympics